Route 2 is a  state highway in Rhode Island, that runs from U.S. Route 1 in Charlestown to US 1 in Providence.

Route description

Route 2 starts at US 1 in Charlestown, which is also the southern terminus of Route 112. Route 2 and Route 112 continue north, and Route 2 splits off to the northeast before intersecting with Route 138. Continuing in a northeast direction, Route 2 has a short concurrency with Route 102 in North Kingstown. It then turns to the north and parallels Route 4 until reaching Interstate 95. Route 2 passes the eastern terminus of Route 3 before reaching an interchange with Interstate 295. It continues through downtown Cranston and has interchanges with Route 37 and Route 10 before reaching its northern terminus at US 1 slightly inside the city line of Providence. Route 2 is a heavily traveled highway in Cranston and Warwick as it is a major commercial corridor.

History

By 1939, Route 2 was paved with concrete between the split from Route 112 and Route 12.  It had short overlaps with Route 117 and Route 5, both of which have been eliminated with interchanges.

For a brief time during the construction of the Route 10 freeway, Route 2 left Reservoir Avenue in Cranston and turned north onto the current Route 10 freeway, ending at the Olneyville exit.

Major intersections

See also

 List of state highways in Rhode Island

References

External links

 2019 Highway Map, Rhode Island

002
Transportation in Washington County, Rhode Island
Transportation in Kent County, Rhode Island
Transportation in Providence County, Rhode Island